The German Economic Commission was the top administrative body in the Soviet Occupation Zone of Germany prior to the creation of the German Democratic Republic.

The DWK was established in June 1947 by the Soviet Military Administration in Germany (German: Sowjetische Militäradministration in Deutschland or SMAD) as a central German auxiliary institution of the SMAD with the task of assisting the SMAD in the execution of economic affairs. The DWK was housed in the former Reich Air Ministry building in East Berlin, at Leipziger Strasse 7.

Initially the SMAD resisted giving the DWK power independent of itself, but this changed after the creation of the merger of the United States' and the United Kingdom's occupation zones into the Bizone in January 1947. A SMAD order from Marshal Vasily Sokolovsky on 12 February 1948 granted the DWK legislative power to issue orders and directives to all German organs within the Soviet zone and converted it into a nascent state structure for all intents and purposes, with competence far beyond the economy proper, thus it became the predecessor of the eventual East German government.
Heinrich Rau became chairman of the converted body and after a reorganisation, announced the new organisational structure on 9 March 1948. In November 1948, the Soviet Central Committee issued another decree authorizing an increase in size of the DWK. This allowed the Socialist Unity Party of Germany under Wilhelm Pieck and Walter Ulbricht to consolidate its control over the DWK, although many former members of the Wehrmacht and the Nazi Party continued to hold posts in it. 

The DWK ceased to exist on 7 October 1949 with the proclamation of the German Democratic Republic.

See also
 Heinrich Rau
 Merger of the KPD and SPD into the Socialist Unity Party of Germany
 German People's Congress
 German People's Council
 People's Control Commission

References

Germany–Soviet Union relations
1947 establishments in Germany
1949 disestablishments in Germany
Politics of East Germany